The Hotel Carlton Madagascar is a hotel in Antananarivo, Madagascar. It was built in 1970 as the Madagascar Hilton and operated under that name until 2007. The hotel has 171 rooms including 6 suites and overlooks Lake Anosy. It is described as one of the few high-rise buildings in the city and the only "truly high-rise building" in Antananarivo. In 2001 it was reported that the hotel was the centre for Madagascar Airtours.

References

External links
Hotel Carlton Madagascar official website
Madacamp.com: Hotel Carlton features

Hotels in Madagascar
Buildings and structures in Antananarivo
Hilton Hotels & Resorts hotels
Hotel buildings completed in 1970
20th-century architecture in Madagascar